"Our Town" is a song used in the 2006 Disney/Pixar animated film Cars. It was written by longtime Pixar contributor Randy Newman and recorded by James Taylor.

Story
The song is a ballad that recounts the economic decline of the fictional town of Radiator Springs after the creation of Interstate 40.

Awards and nominations
At the 49th Grammy Awards (given on February 11, 2007), the song won the Grammy Award for Best Song Written for a Motion Picture, Television or Other Visual Media. The same night, Newman's work for Cars won for Music in an Animated Feature Production at the 34th Annie Awards. The song was also nominated for Academy Award for Best Original Song but lost to "I Need to Wake Up" from An Inconvenient Truth.

International version 
As the track is a background song, not key for the understanding of the plot, "Our Town" was left untranslated in most foreign dubbings. However, it numbers a few translations in various language versions.

References

2006 songs
Randy Newman songs
James Taylor songs
Songs written by Randy Newman
Grammy Award for Best Song Written for Visual Media
Walt Disney Records singles